Donacaula porrectellus is a moth in the family Crambidae. It was described by Francis Walker in 1863. It is found in Bolivia, Brazil (Mato Grosso, Pará), Guyana, Peru and Venezuela.

References

Moths described in 1863
Schoenobiinae